Gary Martin Staines (born 3 July 1963 in Welwyn Garden City) is a male British former long-distance runner.

Athletics career
Staines competed in the 1988 Summer Olympics. He was the silver medallist in the 5000 metres at the 1990 European Athletics Championships. He was also a team silver medallist with Tim Hutchings at the 1989 IAAF World Cross Country Championships.

He represented England in the 10,000 metres event, at the 1990 Commonwealth Games in Auckland, New Zealand.

Staines was successful on the British road racing circuit and was a winner at the Reading Half Marathon (1996), won three-times at the Great South Run (1993, 1994 and 1996), and was twice champion at the Great Edinburgh Run (1993 and 1995). In cross country, he won the 1989 Trofeo Alasport meeting

Personal life
He was formerly married to Australian long jumper Nicole Boegman. He is currently married to British sprinter Linda Keough.

References

1963 births
Living people
Sportspeople from Welwyn Garden City
English male marathon runners
Olympic athletes of Great Britain
Athletes (track and field) at the 1988 Summer Olympics
Athletes (track and field) at the 1990 Commonwealth Games
European Athletics Championships medalists
World Athletics Championships athletes for Great Britain
Commonwealth Games competitors for England